Emberizoides is a small genus of finch-like tanagers found in grassy areas in Central and South America.

Taxonomy and species list
The genus Emberizoides was introduced in 1822 by the Dutch zoologist Coenraad Jacob Temminck. The type species was later designated as the wedge-tailed grass finch by George Robert Gray. The genus name combines the bunting genus Emberiza introduced by Carl Linnaeus in 1758 with the Ancient Greek -oidēs meaning "resembling". This genus was traditionally placed with the buntings and New World sparrows in the subfamily Emberizinae within an expanded family Emberizidae. A molecular phylogenetic study published in 2014 found that Emberizoides was embedded in the tanager family Thraupidae. Within this family, the genus is now placed with Embernagra and Coryphaspiza in the subfamily Emberizoidinae.

The genus contains three species:

References

 
Bird genera